The 1999–2000 PGA Tour of Australasia was a series of men's professional golf events played mainly in Australia and New Zealand. The events were played during the calendar years of 1999 and 2000.

New Zealander Michael Campbell was the runaway leader of the Order of Merit; he won four tournaments during the season and won more than double the prize money of runner-up Lucas Parsons.

Schedule
The following table lists official events during the 1999–2000 season.

Order of Merit
The Order of Merit was based on prize money won during the season, calculated in Australian dollars.

Awards

Source:

Development Tour
The Development Tour was a joint initiative by the PGA Tour of Australasia and the PGA of Australia. The inaugural season consisted of 10 tournaments played between May and October 2000. David Bransdon was the leading money winner on the tour.

Notes

References

External links

PGA Tour of Australasia
Australasia
Australasia
PGA Tour of Australasia
PGA Tour of Australasia
PGA Tour of Australasia
PGA Tour of Australasia